Guy Norman Bee is an American television director, television producer and former Steadicam operator.

Selected filmography

Television director 
 ER
 Third Watch
 Harper's Island
 Criminal Minds
 Veronica Mars (Episode: "Like a Virgin")
 Tru Calling
 Las Vegas
 Law and Order: Special Victims Unit
 Alias
 Kyle XY
 The Unit
 Jericho
 Supernatural
 The Secret Circle
 Ringer
 Revolution
 Arrow
 Beyond (Episode: Last Action Hero)
 APB
 ICE
 Take Two (Episode: It Takes a Thief)
 Blood & Treasure

Steadicam work 
 Ghosts of Mars (2001)
 Magnolia (1999)
 Austin Powers: The Spy Who Shagged Me (1999)
 Deep Impact (1998)
 Titanic (1997)
 My Father the Hero (1994)

References

External links 

 

American television directors
American television producers
Living people
Place of birth missing (living people)
Year of birth missing (living people)